Below are the squads for the 2017 Bandy World Championship final tournament in Sweden.

Group A

Finland
Coach: Antti Parviainen

Kazakhstan

Russia
Coach:

Sweden
Coach: Svenne Olsson

Group B

Belarus

Germany

Norway

United States

References

Bandy World Championship squads